Sassy Pants is a 2012 American comedy-drama film written and directed by Coley Sohn and starring Anna Gunn, Ashley Rickards, Haley Joel Osment, Diedrich Bader, and Jenny O'Hara. The film was released by Phase 4 Films on October 19, 2012.

Cast 
Anna Gunn as June Pruitt, an overbearing mother who has been homeschooling children. She and her children are very estranged and she cannot admit to herself that she is the problem. 
Ashley Rickards as Bethany Pruitt, an 18-year girl who graduated from homeschooling. She wants to go away to college. But her mother wants to keep her here and wants to control her. Why she wants to leave her.
Haley Joel Osment as Chip Hardy, Bethany's father's boyfriend.
Diedrich Bader as Dale Pinto, a divorced gay dad who has a great relationship with his kids. He owns a car lot.
Jenny O'Hara as Grandma Pruitt, an overbearing mother who treats June the same way June treats Bethany. 
Martin Spanjers as Shayne Pruitt
Shanna Collins as Brianna
Aaron Perilo as Cory
Rene Rosado as Hector
Drew Droege as Michael Paul
Jenna Kanell as Anna

Reception
Sassy Pants received mixed reviews from critics. On Rotten Tomatoes, the film has a rating of 50%, based on 6 reviews, with an average rating of 5.5/10. On Metacritic, the film has a rating of 51 out of 100, based on 6 critics, indicating "mixed or average reviews".

References

External links 
 

2012 films
American comedy-drama films
2012 comedy-drama films
American LGBT-related films
2012 LGBT-related films
LGBT-related comedy-drama films
2010s English-language films
2010s American films